Douglas Steven Volmar (January 9, 1945 – June 18, 2017) was an American ice hockey forward who played in 62 games in the National Hockey League with the Detroit Red Wings and Los Angeles Kings between 1970 and 1973. He also played briefly for the San Diego Mariners of the World Hockey Association during the 1974–75 season. Before turning professional he played for Michigan State University. Internationally Volmar played for the American national team at the 1968 Winter Olympics.

Career statistics

Regular season and playoffs

International

Awards and honors

References

External links
 

1945 births
2017 deaths
AHCA Division I men's ice hockey All-Americans
American men's ice hockey right wingers
Columbus Checkers players
Detroit Red Wings players
Ice hockey people from Cleveland
Ice hockey players at the 1968 Winter Olympics
Los Angeles Kings players
Michigan State Spartans men's ice hockey players
NCAA men's ice hockey national champions
Olympic ice hockey players of the United States
Portland Buckaroos players
Richmond Robins players
San Diego Gulls (WHL) players
San Diego Mariners players
Springfield Kings players
Syracuse Blazers players
Tidewater Wings players